Leptocroca aquilonaris is a moth of the family Oecophoridae first described by Alfred Philpott in 1931. It is endemic to New Zealand. The classification of this moth within the genus Leptocroca is regarded as unsatisfactory and in need of revision. As such this species is currently also known as Leptocroca (s.l.) aquilonaris.

References

Moths described in 1931
Oecophoridae
Taxa named by Alfred Philpott
Moths of New Zealand
Endemic fauna of New Zealand
Endemic moths of New Zealand